Sonneratia alba is a mangrove tree in the family Lythraceae. The specific epithet  is from the Latin meaning "white", referring to the flowers.

Description
The cracked to fissured bark is brownish, turning grey below the tidal mark. The flowers are white, with pink at their base.

Distribution and habitat
S. alba grows naturally in many tropical and subtropical areas from East Africa to the Indian subcontinent, southern China, the Ryukyu Islands, Indochina, Malesia, Papuasia, Australia, and the Western Pacific region. Its habitat is sheltered, sandy seashores and tidal creeks.

Uses
In Borneo, S. alba is used as firewood. In Sulawesi, the wood is used in the construction of houses and ships. In Malaysia and Indonesia, the sour fruits are used to flavor fish, and are sometimes eaten raw. The leaves are also eaten raw or cooked.

References

alba
Trees of Africa
Trees of China
Flora of the Ryukyu Islands
Flora of tropical Asia
Trees of Australia
Trees of the Pacific
Plants described in 1816
Central Indo-Pacific flora
Western Indo-Pacific flora